Invasive species in the Everglades are exotic plants and animals that are not native to the area and have aggressively adapted to conditions in wilderness areas in southern Florida. The Everglades are a massive watershed in the southern portion of the U.S. state of Florida that drains overflow from the vast shallow Lake Okeechobee that is in turn fed by the Kissimmee River. The network of ecosystems created by the Everglades are surrounded by urban areas to the east in the South Florida metropolitan area, to the west by Naples and Fort Myers, and to the south by Florida Bay, a marine environment that receives fresh water from and is maintained by the Everglades. As it is surrounded on three sides and close to a major transportation and shipping center, it is particularly vulnerable to the importation of exotic species.

In the 20th century, Florida experienced a population surge unparalleled in the U.S., accompanied by rapid urban expansion made possible by draining portions of the Everglades. The widespread building created new habitats and disturbed established plant and animal communities. Many of the new residents or tourists in Florida were responsible for introducing plant species to the area by accident, or deliberately to improve landscaping. Many animals have been introduced similarly, and have either escaped or been released to proliferate on their own. Several terms are used to identify non-native species: exotic, invader, immigrant, colonist, introduced, nonindigenous, and naturalized. "Naturalized" usually refers to species that have adapted to a region over a long period of time, while "invasive" refers to particularly destructive or aggressive species.

Approximately 26 percent of all fish, reptiles, birds, and mammals in South Florida are exotic—more than in any other part of the United States—and the region hosts one of the highest numbers of exotic plant species in the world. Many of the biological controls like weather, disease, and consumers that naturally limit plants in their native environments do not exist in the Everglades, causing many to grow larger and multiply far beyond their average numbers in their native habitats. Similarly, animals often do not find the predators or natural barriers to reproduction in the Everglades as they do where they originated, thus they often reproduce more quickly and efficiently. Concerns over the quality of the Everglades were raised in the beginning of the 20th century, and by  2000 a federally funded initiative was enacted that gave Everglades restoration the distinction of being the largest planned environmental rehabilitation in history. Exotic species control falls under the management of the U.S. Fish and Wildlife Service, which has been compiling and disseminating information about invasive species since 1994. Control of invasive species costs $500 million a year, but  of land in South Florida remains infested.

Plant species 
As the fields of ecology and environmental studies develop, exotic species attract more attention and their effects become more apparent. Mid-20th century biology texts about invading species reflected more complacency than alarm, as contemporary wisdom about them assumed the host environment would be largely immune. Everglades biologist Thomas Lodge writes that in the 1960s, evidence of non-native plant and animal life in South Florida was present but not particularly "worthy of notice." Over the past decades, however, the number of exotic species and their spread has increased dramatically.

The Everglades hosts 1,301 species of native flora that are tropical or subtropical in nature, which arrived on the Florida peninsula about 5,000 years ago. Winds, water, and birds carried most of the tropical flora. The subtropical species spread from more northern locations. As of 2010 1,392 additional non-native plant species have been identified and established themselves in South Florida. A variety of avenues are available for species to be brought by humans deliberately or by accident: agricultural experiments, in shipping containers, or attached to vehicles. South Florida is a transportation hub for shipping and traffic between the U.S. and the Caribbean and Central and South America. In 1990, 333 million plants were brought into Miami International Airport. Both the United States Department of Agriculture (USDA) and the University of Florida Institute of Food and Agriculture Sciences (IFAS) experiment with plants in laboratories throughout Florida.

State, local, and federal government agencies spend millions of dollars to rid South Florida of invasive species and prevent more from entering the region. Plants that are imported to Florida are subject to classification as "Restricted" or "Prohibited", but a new designation is being considered "Not Authorized Pending Plant Risk Analysis", to allow scientists to assess what damage exotic plants may cause to the South Florida environment. A nonprofit organization named The Florida Exotic Pest Plant Council lists exotic species as belonging in Category I: "altering native plant communities by displacing native species, changing community structures or ecological functions, or hybridizing with natives"; and Category II: "increased in abundance or frequency but have not yet altered Florida plant communities to the extent shown by Category I". More than 100 species have been placed in Category I, but a few have been singled out for the potential to cause the most destruction based on how rapidly they reproduce, their displacement of native flora by crowding, shading, or fire, excellent adaptations to conditions in the Everglades, and the potential to spread (or evidence that they have spread) into remote areas of the Everglades.

Animal species 

Although the general effects of invasive animals is not as profound as plants, they are more noticeable in many instances and a constant reminder of the many exotic species in the region. A wildlife biologist and several construction workers near Homestead Air Force Base witnessed a scene where several iguanas sunning themselves in a canal were attacked by a spectacled caiman, to the surprise of all.

About 12,500 species of insects are native to Florida, most of which naturally flew into the region from the Caribbean or Southeastern United States. An additional 1,000 have been identified as exotic. Insects create about $1 billion of damage to structures and agriculture in Florida each year. The tide of arriving insects is nearly impossible to control with the volume of goods and shipments coming into South Florida. Imported citrus is a major avenue for damaging insects. Twenty-one species have been imported and released to act as biological control agents: to impede the growth of invasive plants or counter the effects of other insects. Others, such as the Madagascan hissing cockroach (Gromphadorhina portentosa) and European cricket (Acheta domesticus) are sold as pets or fishing bait, and are then released into backyards. Similarly, aquatic invertebrates such as mussels, clams, snails, and melania find their ways into local waters from the bottoms of ships or in bilge holds. The aquarium trade also supplies enthusiasts with exotic species which are dumped or escape into waterways.

Excluding insects and other arthropods, 192 exotic animal species have established themselves in Florida as of 2009. More than 50 species of fish have been introduced. Early recorded species were the pike killifish (Belonesox belizanus) and oscar (Astronotus ocellatus). The extensive network of canals throughout South Florida allows many species to disperse more readily than they would under natural conditions as many regions in the Everglades go dry each year or experience extended drought periods. The overall impact of exotic fishes on the native populations and habitats is largely unknown.

The Florida Fish and Wildlife Conservation Commission (FWC) initiated a task force to concentrate on identifying the most invasive animals. The agency created a list of "Reptiles of Concern" for the Burmese python, African rock python (Python sebae), amethystine python (Simalia amethystinus), reticulated python (Malayopython reticulatus), green anaconda (Eunectes murinus), and Nile monitor. Florida also began requiring owners to pay a permit fee of $100 a year and place microchips on the animals. These predators are included on the list for their formidable size and aggressive natures; animals that were in the Everglades before the list was created, however, are breeding in the wild.  Burmese Pythons have become of particular concern as they are starting to adapt to new environment, they easily hide, and in recent years, the population of other species is declining, particularly in the Everglades. To combat the number of exotic snakes in the U.S., and specifically in South Florida, the U.S. Department of the Interior added four species of snakes—the Burmese python, both subspecies of the African rock python (northern and southern), and the yellow anaconda (Eunectes notaeus)—to Lacey Act provisions, making their import into the U.S. illegal, in 2012. 

Exotic birds do not attract the same amount of attention. They too have been brought to Florida as part of the pet trade and escape, get released by dealers attempting to avoid quarantine restrictions, or escape from damaged cages and artificial habitats during tropical storms. Typically, however, most nonindigenous birds live closer to populated areas; some populations of birds establish themselves but decline for unapparent reasons.

More than 50 species of exotic mammals have been recorded in South Florida, at least 19 of which are self-sustaining. Colonies of feral mammals are established in or around the Everglades, including dogs, pigs, and cats. Wild animals native to other parts of the U.S. have also been established, including nine-banded armadillos (Dasypus novemcinctus), coyotes (Canis latrans), and jaguarundi (Herpailurus yaguarondi).

Florida has enacted laws to prohibit the release of exotic animals into the wild. To dissuade people from dumping animals, local authorities have begun holding "Nonnative Amnesty Days" in several Florida locations where pet owners who are no longer willing or able to take care of non-traditional pets such as snakes, lizards, amphibians, birds, and mammals—excluding dogs, cats, and ferrets—can deposit animals without being prosecuted for illegal dumping of exotic species. The FWC has furthermore allowed hunters permits to capture Reptiles of Concern in a specific hunting season in wildlife management areas, euthanize the animals immediately and sell the meat and hides.

Invertebrates

Fish

Reptiles

Birds

Mammals

See also
Burmese pythons in Florida
Invasive species in the United States
List of invasive marine fish in Florida
List of invasive plant species in Florida
List of invasive species in Florida

Footnotes

References
 Ferriter, Amy; Serbesoff-King, Kristina; Bodle, Mike; Goodyear, Carole; Doren, Bob; Langeland, Ken (2004). Chapter 8E: Exotic Species in the Everglades Protection Area, South Florida Water Management District
 Ferriter, Amy; Thayer, Dan; Bodle, Mike; Doren, Bob (2009). Chapter 9: The Status of Nonindigenous Species in the South Florida Environment, 2009 South Florida Environmental Report (Volume I), South Florida Water Management District. 
 Lodge, Thomas E. (2005). The Everglades Handbook. Understanding the Ecosystem. CRC Press. 
 Rodgers, LeRoy; Bodle, Mike; Laroche, Francois (2010). Chapter 9: Status of Nonindigenous Species in the South Florida Environment, 2010 South Florida Environmental Report (Volume I), South Florida Water Management District.
 Rodriguez, Tommy (2011). Visions of the Everglades: History Ecology Preservation. Author House. 
 Simberloff, Daniel; Achmitz, Don; Brown, Tom (1997). Strangers in Paradise: Impact Management of Nonindigenous Species in Florida, Island Press.

External links
 United States Department of Agriculture Resources for Florida
 Florida's Nonnative Fish and Wildlife
 Alien Invaders: Exotic Plants in the Everglades
 Florida Exotic Pest Plant Council
 Everglades Cooperative Invasive Species Management Area
 Mapping Exotic Vegetation in the Everglades from Large-Scale Aerial Photographs
 Exotic Plant Species as Problems and Solutions in Ecological Restoration: A Synthesis

Invasive plant
E
Invasive
Everglades